Mark Sorenson may refer to:
Mark Sorenson (rugby union) (born 1979), New Zealand rugby union player
Mark Sorenson (softball), New Zealand softballer